Regionalist Party of the Leonese Country is a regional political party in Castilla y León, Spain. PREPAL strives to establish a separate autonomous community (País Leonés or Autonomous Community of País Leonés) for the provinces of Salamanca, Zamora and León, (parts of the old Kingdom of León), now in the Autonomous Community of Castile and León. This movement is known as Leonesism.

PREPAL was founded in 1980 by Francisco Iglesias Carreño.

Other information
List of registered political parties in Spain
List of political parties in Spain
List of active autonomist and secessionist movements

See also
País Leonés
Kingdom of León
Leonese language
Leonese Country

References

External links
  Official Page

Political parties in the Province of León
Regionalist parties in Spain
Political parties established in 1980
1980 establishments in Spain